The Queen of Württemberg was the queen consort of the ruler of the Kingdom of Württemberg, from its establishment in 1806 to its abolition in 1918. Salic law required all rulers of Württemberg to be male and so there was never a queen regnant of Württemberg.

Duchess consort of Württemberg, 1495–1803

Electress consort of Württemberg, 1803–1806

Queen consort of Württemberg, 1806–1918 

 
Wurttemberg, Countess of
Wurttemberg, Duchess of
Wurttemberg, Queen of
History of Württemberg
Lists of German nobility
Württemberg